Kingsford Community School is a secondary school in Beckton in the London Borough of Newham, East London, England. It opened in September 2000, and educates full-time students from the ages of 11 to 16. The current headteacher is Joan Deslandes, who was appointed an OBE in 2017 in the Queen's Birthday Honours List for her services to education.  Ofsted has described the school as "a harmonious community in which everyone lives and breathes the school’s values of aspiration, achievement and excellence."

International School
Kingsford Community School is a long-standing holder of the British Council's International School Award in recognition of the international dimension to the school's curriculum and provision.

Confucius Classroom
In 2001, Kingsford became one of the first schools in the United Kingdom to introduce lessons of Mandarin to its curriculum.  In 2007, the school became the first Confucius Classroom, a centre for promoting Mandarin Language and Chinese Culture, in London and the South-East.  Subsequently, the school has worked closely with both the Specialist Schools and Academies Trust and Hanban (the National Office for Teaching Chinese as a Foreign Language), now CLEC (Chinese Center for Language Education and Cooperation) in order to develop its own Chinese learning programme and also to promote the teaching of the Chinese language and culture to other schools in the capital and South-East region. As a designated SSAT ‘hub school’, Kingsford works closely with both CLEC and the SSAT with the aim of expanding the network of Confucius Classrooms in the UK. This task has been facilitated by Kingsford’s partner school in China, Peking University Middle School.  The school’s considerable expertise has led to it being recognised by Hanban (now CLEC) as one of the best Confucius Classrooms in the world. Kingsford has played an instrumental role in developing the Mandarin Excellence Programme, which offers pupils a unique immersion experience and the opportunity to leave the school with the prestigious HSK level 3 proficiency certificate, and scholarships to continue Mandarin studies at top institutions in China.

Links with independent schools
Pupils who take part in the school's Scholarship Aspiration Programme are able to secure fully funded scholarships at leading independent schools, boarding and day schools, at home and abroad.
In recent years graduates from the programme have benefited from and enriched the learning communities of prestigious institutions such as Brighton College, Eton College, Wellington College, and University College School Hampstead, as well as many others across the UK.  The school's Head Teacher Joan Deslandes has been a member of a number of influential groups formed to strengthen partnerships between the public and independent sectors.

The 100 Group
The 100 Group was a collection of the 50 leading state school heads and 50 independent school heads selected in discussion between former Schools Secretary, Ed Balls, headmaster of Brighton College, Richard Cairns, and Joan Deslandes, headteacher of Kingsford Community School. The heads were chosen on the basis of their standing in their sectors, their commitment to furthering co-operation between the independent and state sectors and their public contributions to educational debate.

On 22 January 2010 Kingsford hosted the 100 Group's second annual conference, on the subject of social mobility.  The event included contributions from Vince Cable MP and Michael Gove MP (Secretary of State for Education).   Former Prime Minister, Gordon Brown, also addressed the conference via a video message.  “I want to congratulate the 100 Group for its innovative role in bringing state and independent schools together to improve education and social mobility and particularly the pioneers of that partnership, Kingsford Community School and Brighton College, whose successful alliance is a blueprint for others”, he said.

Ofsted Report
In October 2022, Ofsted rated the school as "good" with many areas, including Leadership and Management and Behaviour and safety of pupils being graded "outstanding". According to the report, "Pupils are very well prepared to succeed and flourish in modern
Britain." . />

References
.

External links
School Website: http://www.kingsfordschool.org.uk

Educational institutions established in 2000
Secondary schools in the London Borough of Newham
2000 establishments in England
Community schools in the London Borough of Newham
Beckton
Specialist language colleges in England